The 1992–93 Pilkington Cup was the 22nd edition of England's premier rugby union club competition at the time. Leicester won the competition defeating Harlequins in the final. The event was sponsored by Pilkington and the final was held at Twickenham Stadium.

Draw and results

First round

Second round

Third round

Fourth round

Quarter-finals

Semi-finals

Final

References

External links 
 Tigers Classic | Pilkington Cup Final: Leicester Tigers v Harlequins <1993>. Official Leicester Tigers YouTube channel.

1992–93 rugby union tournaments for clubs
1992–93 in English rugby union
1992-93